Fusobacterium polymorphum is a bacterium that has been isolated from the gingival crevice in humans, and has been implicated in the immunopathology of periodontal disease. It has also been isolated in guinea pigs in research studies.

References

Gram-negative bacteria
Bacteria described in 1922
Fusobacteriota